The Spendthrift is a 1915 silent film drama directed by Walter Edwin and starring Irene Fenwick. It is based on a 1910 Broadway play, The Spendthrift, by Porter Emerson Browne.

It is a surviving film in the Library of Congress collections.

Cast
Irene Fenwick - Frances Ward
Cyril Keightley - Richard Ward
Malcolm Duncan - Monty Ward
John Nicholson - Phil Cartright
Mattie Ferguson - Aunt Gretchen Jans
Viola Savoy - Clarice Van Zandt
Grace Leigh - Show Girl
J.C. Hackett - Secretary
Roy Pilcher - Suffern Thorne

References

External links
The Spendthrift at IMDb.com

1915 films
American silent feature films
American films based on plays
1915 drama films
American black-and-white films
Silent American drama films
1910s American films
1910s English-language films